Trébrivan is a commune in the Côtes-d'Armor department of Brittany in northwestern France.

Population

Inhabitants of Trébrivan are called trébrivanais in French.

Transportation
There is an infrequent bus service between Trebrivan and Carhaix-Plouguer to the west which runs to Maël-Carhaix and Rostrenen to the east. Apart from that, the village is not accessible by public transport.

People
Trebrivan is the home village of Breton musician Soig Siberil.

See also
Communes of the Côtes-d'Armor department

References

External links

Communes of Côtes-d'Armor